Zimbabwe have made two Rugby World Cup appearances – in 1987 and 1991.

In the 1987 Rugby World Cup, Zimbabwe's national rugby team was invited as the African entrant. No other African countries were invited, as South Africa was disqualified from the tournament due to a sporting boycott adopted by the international community in response to apartheid.

However, Zimbabwe succeeded in getting through 1991 Rugby World Cup qualifying, and hosted the Africa qualifications. In more recent years, the Namibia national rugby union team has generally defeated Zimbabwe in African qualifying rounds.

By position
 1987 Rugby World Cup Eliminated in pool stages
 1991 Rugby World Cup Eliminated in pool stages
 1995 Rugby World Cup Did not qualify.
 1999 Rugby World Cup Did not qualify.
 2003 Rugby World Cup Did not qualify.
 2007 Rugby World Cup Did not qualify.
 2011 Rugby World Cup Did not qualify.
 2015 Rugby World Cup Did not qualify.
 2019 Rugby World Cup Did not qualify.

Matches

1987 Rugby World Cup

Pool 4 games –

1991 Rugby World Cup
Pool 2 games –

1995 Rugby World Cup
Did not qualify.

1999 Rugby World Cup
Did not qualify.

2003 Rugby World Cup
Did not qualify.

2007 Rugby World Cup
Did not qualify.

2011 Rugby World Cup
Did not qualify.

2015 Rugby World Cup
Did not qualify.

2019 Rugby World Cup
Did not qualify.

Overall record

Team Records

Most Points in a Tournament
53 (1987)
31 (1991)

Most Points in a Game
21 vs  (1987)
20 vs  (1987)
12 vs  (1991)
12 vs  (1987)

Biggest Winning Margin
NIL

Highest Score Against
70 vs  (1987)
60 vs  (1987)
55 vs  (1991)
52 vs  (1991)
51 vs  (1991)

Biggest Losing Margin
58 vs  (1987)
44 vs  (1991)
44 vs  (1991)
39 vs  (1987)
39 vs  (1991)

Most Tries in a Game
3 vs  (1987)
2 vs  (1991)
2 vs  (1991)
2 vs  (1991)

Individual records

Most appearances
6 Michael Martin (1987, 1991)
5 Richard Tsimba (1987, 1991)
4 Andy Ferreria (1987, 1991)
4 Craig Brown (1987, 1991)
4 Alex Nicholis (1987, 1991)

Most points overall
25 Marthinus Grobler (1987)
12 Richard Tsimba  (1987, 1991)
11 Andy Ferreria (1987, 1991)
8 Adrian Garvey (1991)

Most points in a game
17 vs  - Marthinus Grobler (1987)
8 vs  - Adrian Garvey (1991)
8 vs  - Andy Ferreria (1987)
6 vs  - Richard Tsimba  (1987)

Most tries overall
2 Richard Tsimba  (1987, 1991)
2 Adrian Garvey (1991)

Most penalty goals
7 Marthinus Grobler (1987)
3 Andy Ferreria (1987, 1991)

Most penalty goals in a game
5 vs  - Marthinus Grobler (1987)
2 vs  - Marthinus Grobler (1987)
2 vs  - Andy Ferreria (1987)
1 vs  - Andy Ferreria (1991)

Hosting
So far Zimbabwe has not hosted any World Cup games.

References
 Davies, Gerald (2004) The History of the Rugby World Cup (Sanctuary Publishing Ltd,
 Farr-Jones, Nick, (2003). Story of the Rugby World Cup, Australian Post Corporation,

Zimbabwe
Zimbabwe national rugby union team